Sébastien Martins (born 18 November 1985), also known by the nickname of "Seb", is a rugby league footballer who plays for the Limoux Grizzlies in the Elite One Championship.

He has previously played for the Catalans Dragons in the Super League competition.

Background
Martins was born in Perpignan, France.

Career
He is mainly a utility player at home in the front row, second row or centres. Martins signed for National League One club Leigh until the end of the 2007 season. He was signed from French League team Baroudeurs de Pia XIII. He was named in the France training squad for the 2008 Rugby League World Cup.
Martins continued to represent France in the 2009 Four Nations tournament. In April 2014, Martins joined North Wales Crusaders as cover for the departing Ryan MacDonald.

References

External links

 http://www.catalansdragons.com/fr/joueur_SebastienMartins.php

1985 births
Living people
Catalans Dragons players
France national rugby league team players
French rugby league players
Hull Kingston Rovers players
Leigh Leopards players
Lézignan Sangliers players
Limoux Grizzlies players
Newcastle Thunder players
North Wales Crusaders players
Rugby league props
Toulouse Olympique players
Whitehaven R.L.F.C. players